Verticordia halophila, commonly known as salt-loving featherflower, or salt-loving verticordia, is a flowering plant in the myrtle family, Myrtaceae and is endemic to the south-west of Western Australia. It is an erect, bushy shrub with small, crowded, thick leaves and spikes of red and pink flowers in spring.

Description
The leaves on the flowering stems are broadly egg-shaped to almost round.

The petals are mauve-pink, erect, with short, coarse teeth along their top edge. Flowering time is from September to December.

It is distinguished from similar verticordias by its thick, crowded leaves, the serrations on the top edge of the petals, the purple-tipped style and by the saline environment in which it is found.

Taxonomy and naming
Verticordia halophila was first formally described by Alex George in 1991 and the description was published in Nuytsia. The type collection was made by Alex and Elizabeth George south of Coorow in 1985. The specific epithet (halophila) is "named from the Greek hals (salt) and -philus (loving), in reference to the habitat which is unusual in the genus".

When Alex George reviewed the genus in 1991, he placed this species in subgenus Eperephes, section Verticordella along with V. pennigera, V. blepharophylla, V. lindleyi, V. carinata, V. attenuata, V. drummondii, V. wonganensis, V. paludosa, V. luteola, V. bifimbriata, V. tumida, V. mitodes, V. centipeda, V. auriculata, V. pholidophylla, V. spicata and V. hughanii.

An isolated population recognised as a variant of this species was redescribed as Verticordia elizabethiae in 2020.

Distribution and habitat
This verticordia usually grows in sand and clay on flats that are slightly saline and on the edges of salt lakes in woodland and shrubland. It is found in and near areas around Coorow, Marchagee  and Lake Seabrook in the Avon Wheatbelt and Geraldton Sandplains biogeographic regions.

The distribution range included the Coolgardie bioregion, a population around 200 km inland, until a 2020 revision recognised it as a separate species, Verticordia elizabethiae.

Conservation
Verticordia halophila is classified as "not threatened" by the Western Australian Government Department of Parks and Wildlife.

Use in horticulture
Some forms of this species are being grown in cultivation and are performing well. Some are bushy shrubs which are producing honey-scented flowers from October to March, sometimes in other months.

References

halophila
Halophytes
Endemic flora of Western Australia
Myrtales of Australia
Rosids of Western Australia
Plants described in 1844